Wortwell is a village and civil parish in the English county of Norfolk and adjoining the county of Suffolk. It is located on both the River Waveney (which forms the county boundary) and the A143 road, some 20 km east of Diss and 30 km west of Lowestoft. The city of Norwich lies approximately 30 km to the north.

The village name originates from roughly 1704 when naturally occurring 'Wort' was found to spring from a well fed by a water source near to the local river Waveney. When the local brewer was satisfied with the beer brewed from the 'Wortwell' he would ring a bell to let the local residents know it was ready for drinking, which also gave the local drinking establishment its name, established as a pub in 1836.

For the purposes of local government, the parish falls within the district of South Norfolk.

The village of Wortwell is one of the few in Norfolk not to be listed in the Domesday Book. Until the end of the 19th century Wortwell was a hamlet within the parish of Mendham-in-Norfolk, (the modern village of Mendham is south of the River Waveney in Suffolk) becoming a parish in the 1885 boundary alterations.

Ezekiel Blomfield (1778–1818), a Congregational minister, author and compiler of religious works and works on natural history, was buried on 21 July 1818 in the grounds of the Meeting House at Wortwell.

Wortwell has a well established football club with its two football teams currently play in the Anglian Combination Football League, the first team playing in division 2 and the reserves playing in division 6. Playing home games at the rec at Wortwell community centre village hall.

References

 Ordnance Survey (1999). OS Explorer Map 230 - Diss & Harleston. .
 Ordnance Survey (1999). OS Explorer Map 231 - Southwold & Bungay. .
 Office for National Statistics & Norfolk County Council (2001). Census population and household counts for unparished urban areas and all parishes. Retrieved 2 December 2005.

External links

Diss Express - village's local newspaper website
.
Information from Genuki Norfolk on Wortwell
Wortwell Community Centre - Village Events page.

Villages in Norfolk
Civil parishes in Norfolk